The 2011 South Asian Beach Games will be held in Hambantota, Sri Lanka, from October 8 to October 14, 2011. A total of about 359 athletes representing 8 National Olympic Committees from South Asian countries participated in these Games. Overall, 26 events in 10 disciplines were contested.

Medal table

3-on-3 basketball

Men

Group A

Bronze medal match

Gold medal match

Women

Group A

Bronze medal match

Gold medal match

Beach football

Group A

Bronze medal match

Gold medal match

Beach handball

Group A 

Both India and Pakistan awarded gold

Beach kabaddi

Men

Group A

Gold medal match

Women

Group A

Gold medal match

Beach netball

Beach volleyball

Tent pegging

Lifesaving

Marathon swimming

Windsurfing

References

External links

2011 South Asian Beach Games